Perry Street Historic District may refer to:
 Perry Street Historic District (Montgomery, Alabama), listed on the NRHP in Alabama
 South Perry Street Historic District, Montgomery, AL, listed on the NRHP in Alabama
 Perry Street Historic District (Helena-West Helena, Arkansas), listed on the NRHP in Arkansas